The UK Rock & Metal Singles Chart is a record chart which ranks the best-selling rock and heavy metal songs in the United Kingdom. Compiled and published by the Official Charts Company, the data is based on each track's weekly physical sales and digital downloads . The first number one of the year was "Bohemian Rhapsody" by Queen. All but five weeks of the year were dominated by "Bohemian Rhapsody" by Queen, with "People" by The 1975 being the only new release to top the chart.

Chart history

See also
List of UK Rock & Metal Albums Chart number ones of 2019

References

External links
Official UK Rock & Metal Singles Chart Top 40 at the Official Charts Company
The Official UK Top 40 Rock Singles at BBC Radio 1

2019 in British music
United Kingdom Rock and Metal Singles
2019